The Wisconsin Badgers represented the University of Wisconsin in WCHA women's ice hockey during the 2018-19 NCAA Division I women's ice hockey season. Defeating the Minnesota Golden Gophers in the 2019 NCAA National Collegiate Women's Ice Hockey Tournament, it was the fifth national championship in program history and their first national title since 2011. Goaltender Kristen Campbell recorded 27 saves, recording her 11th shutout of the season. Of note, seniors Sophia Shaver and Annie Pankowski scored for the Badgers in the national championship game. During the 2019 postseason, Pankowski amassed 11 goals in seven games. With her goal in the national championship game, a shorthanded marker in the second period, she set a new program record for most shorthanded goals in Badgers history.

Offseason

Recruiting

Regular season

Standings

Schedule

|-
!colspan=12 style="  "| Regular Season

Roster

2018–19 Badgers

Awards and honors
Annie Pankowski, 2018-19 All-America selection (First Team)
Kristen Campbell, 2018-19 All-America selection (Second Team)

WCHA Weekly Awards
Kristen Campbell, WCHA Goaltender of the Week (awarded November 6)
Kristen Campbell, WCHA Goaltender of the Week (awarded November 20)
Mekenzie Steffen, WCHA Defensive Player of the Week (awarded November 6)

WCHA honors
Annie Pankowski, WCHA Offensive Player of the Year
Kristen Campbell, WCHA Goaltender of the Year
Kristen Campbell, WCHA Goaltending Champion (Campbell led WCHA netminders with a 1.08 goals-against average in league play)
Sophie Shirley, WCHA Rookie of the Year
Mark Johnson, WCHA Coach of the Year

WCHA All-Stars
Kristen Campbell, 2018-19 All-WCHA First Team
Annie Pankowski, 2018-19 All-WCHA First Team
Mekenzie Steffen, 2018-19 All-WCHA First Team
Sophie Shirley, 2018-19 All-WCHA Second Team
Abby Roque, 2018-19 All-WCHA Second Team
Maddie Rolfes, 2018-19 All-WCHA Second Team

WCHA All-Rookie Team
Britta Curl, Forward
Sophie Shirley, Forward

WCHA 20th Anniversary Team
Ann-Renée Desbiens, Goaltender (2013-17)

References

Wisconsin
Wisconsin Badgers women's ice hockey seasons
Wisconsin
Wisconsin
Wisconsin
NCAA women's ice hockey Frozen Four seasons
NCAA women's ice hockey championship seasons